Sid Carroll (28 November 1922 – 12 October 1984) was an Australian cricketer. He played 46 first-class matches for New South Wales between 1945/46 and 1958/59.

See also
 List of New South Wales representative cricketers

References

External links
 

1922 births
1984 deaths
Australian cricketers
New South Wales cricketers
Cricketers from Sydney